This is a list of battles involving the Russian Federation. 

 Russian Federation
Russian Federation
Battles
Battles